Sichuanese or Szechwanese (Sichuanese Pinyin: Si4cuan1hua4), also called Sichuanese/Szechwanese Mandarin is a branch of Southwestern Mandarin spoken mainly in Sichuan and Chongqing, which was part of Sichuan Province until 1997, and the adjacent regions of their neighboring provinces, such as Hubei, Guizhou, Yunnan, Hunan and Shaanxi. Although "Sichuanese" is often synonymous with the Chengdu-Chongqing dialect, there is still a great amount of diversity among the Sichuanese dialects, some of which are mutually unintelligible with each other. In addition, because Sichuanese is the lingua franca in Sichuan, Chongqing and part of Tibet, it is also used by many Tibetan, Yi, Qiang and other ethnic minority groups as a second language.

Sichuanese is more similar to Standard Chinese than southeastern Chinese varieties but is still quite divergent in phonology, vocabulary, and even grammar. The Minjiang dialect is especially difficult for speakers of other Mandarin dialects to understand. Sichuanese can be further divided into a number of dialects, Chengdu–Chongqing dialect, Minjiang dialect, Renshou–Fushun dialect, and Ya'an–Shimian dialect. The dialect of Chengdu, the capital of Sichuan province and an important central city is the most representative dialect of Southwestern Mandarin and is used widely in Sichuan opera and other art forms of the region.

Modern Sichuanese evolved due to a great wave of immigration during the Ming dynasty (1368–1644): many immigrants, mainly from Hunan, Hubei, Jiangxi and Guangdong flooded into Sichuan bringing their languages with them. The influence of Sichuanese has resulted in a distinct form of Standard Chinese that is often confused with "real" Sichuanese. Sichuanese, spoken by about 120 million people, would rank tenth among languages by number of speakers (just behind Japanese) if counted as a separate language.

Geographic distribution and dialects
Sichuanese is mainly spoken in and around the Sichuan Basin, which includes almost all of Sichuan Province and Chongqing Municipality except for some Tibetan and Yi inhabited areas. It is also spoken in the border regions of Sichuan's neighboring provinces: northern Yunnan and Guizhou, southern Shaanxi and western Hubei.

However, it is possible to divide Sichuanese into four sub-dialects according to the preservation or distribution of the Middle Chinese checked tone: the Minjiang dialect which preserves the checked tone, the Chengdu-Chongqing dialect in which the checked tone has merged into the light level tone, the Renshou-Fushun dialect which merges the checked tone into the departing tone, and the Ya'an-Shimian dialect in which the checked tone is merged into the dark level tone.

The Minjiang, Ya'an-Shimian and Renshou-Fushun dialects are spoken mainly in South and West Sichuan, regions in which the inhabitants have significantly more indigenous Sichuanese descent than those of North and East Sichuan. Thus, these dialects are often referred as Old Sichuanese, as the preserve many characteristics of Bashu, the extinct language formerly spoken by the first Sichuanese Han Chinese people. The Chengdu-Chongqing dialect, named after the two largest cities in greater Sichuan, are spoken in a contiguous area mainly in North and East Sichuan. It is often referred as New Sichuanese because it exhibits fewer characteristics of the Bashu language.

History
Like many of the southern provinces in China, Sichuan was fully sinicized by the end of the Tang Dynasty. The modern variety of Chinese spoken in the region formed relatively recently. In the thirteenth century, the population of Sichuan dropped precipitously, suspected to be due in part to a series of plagues and Mongol invasions. The population did not recover until it was replenished by subsequent migrations from Hubei, as well as Xiang, Gan and Hakka-speakers in the following centuries. These varieties largely supplanted the earlier varieties of Chinese in Sichuan, known as Ba-Shu Chinese or Old Sichuanese. Like Min Chinese, Ba-Shu Chinese was different from the Middle Chinese of the Sui, Tang and Song Dynasties, but instead a divergent dialect group independently descended from the Old Chinese of the Han Dynasty, which formed a substratum that influenced the formation of the modern dialect group and helps to explain the distinctiveness of Modern Sichuanese within the Mandarin dialect continuum.

Phonology

Tones
There are five phonemic tones in Sichuanese: dark level tone, light level tone, rising tone, departing tone and entering tone (or checked tone). In some regions the checked tone of Sichuanese has been merged into another tone, which is very different from standard Mandarin, whose checked tone has been merged irregularly into the other 4 tones. According to Phonology of Sichuan dialect, among all the 150 Sichuanese-speaking cities and counties, 48 keep the checked tone while the other 102 have only 4 tones. Particularly, in some sub-dialects of Minjiang dialect (such as Yingjing dialect), the departing tone has developed into two different tones: a colloquial tone (which is similar to the second tone as a characteristic of Ba-Shu) and a literary tone (which is the same as Chengdu dialect).

The tone contours of the Sichuanese dialects are highly and quite different from those of Beijing Mandarin. In Sichuanese, the first tone (dark level tone) is a high level tone (like Beijing), the second tone (light level tone) is a low falling tone (the mirror image of Beijing), the third tone (rising tone) is a high falling tone and the fourth tone (departing tone) is a low or mid rising tone (interchanged compared to Beijing) and the fifth tone (entering tone) is mid or high if it's not merged, as shown in the chart below.

In the areas which keep the entering tone, the five tones of Sichuanese are nearly identical to the values of 5 of the 6 tones of the indigenous Southern Qiang language.

Initials
Initials (or syllable onsets) are initial consonants of possible syllables. There are 21 initials in the Chengdu dialect of Sichuanese (academically referred as Standard Sichuanese).

The following is the initial consonant inventory of Sichuanese, transcribed in the International Phonetic Alphabet, and under every IPA symbol in the inventory below there is the transcription of that sound in Sichuanese Pinyin and a Chinese character using that initial:

Finals
A final, the remainder of syllable after the initial, consists of an optional medial glide, a vowel and an optional final consonants. There are 36 finals in the Chengdu dialect of Sichuanese.

The following is the inventory of Sichuanese finals, transcribed in the International Phonetic Alphabet, and under every IPA symbol in the inventory below there is the standard orthography of that sound in Sichuanese Pinyin and a Chinese character using that final:

Tense vowels for checked tone
There is a discrepancy between Old Sichuanese and New Sichuanese in terms of finals. In the "old" Minjiang dialect, the stop consonants for checked-tone syllables in Middle Chinese have developed into tense vowels to create a phonemic contrast, and in several cities and counties the tense vowels are followed by a glottal stop to emphasize the contrast. Meanwhile, the checked tone has disappeared in other Sichuanese dialects. The following table shows the tense vowels of Minjiang dialect's three sub-dialects, spoken in Luzhou, Qionglai and Leshan, and a comparison with other Sichuanese dialects is also presented.

Literary and colloquial readings
The existence of literary and colloquial readings, is a notable feature in Sichuanese and some other Sinitic varieties, such as Cantonese or Hokkien. In Sichuanese, colloquial readings tend to resemble Ba-Shu Chinese (Middle Sichuanese) or Southern Old Mandarin, while literary readings tend to resemble modern standard Mandarin. Meanwhile, its literary reading, is relatively similar to the standard Mandarin pronunciation . The table below shows some examples of Chinese characters with both literary and colloquial readings in Sichuanese.

Vocabulary
Only 47.8% of Sichuanese vocabulary is in common with the Beijing dialect on which Standard Chinese is based; indeed Sichuanese shares more vocabulary with the Xiang and Gan varieties of Chinese, even though Sichuanese is usually classified as a dialect of Mandarin.

The vocabulary of Sichuanese has three main origins: Ba-Shu (or Ancient Sichuanese), Middle Chinese and the languages of the immigrants, including Proto-Mandarin from Hubei, Xiang, Gan and Hakka, which were brought to Sichuan during the Ming and Qing Dynasties. Recently, many loanwords have been introduced to Sichuanese from standard Mandarin and English. Meanwhile, new Sichuanese words are developing in large cities, such as Chengdu and Chongqing, which then spread at a dramatic speed through Sichuan. "" (xiong2qi3) (meaning "to cheer someone on") is a typical example of a novel Sichuanese word, equivalent to "" in standard Mandarin.
"耙耳朵" (Pá ěr duo) is a word exclusive to Sichuanese, which means "henpecked husbands". A standard Mandarin equivalent of "" is "" (qī guǎn yán). The prototype of "" comes from a kind of bicycle with "ears" in Chengdu, which was first invented by men in Chengdu in order to make their wives sit more comfortably. There are still a few such bikes on streets of Chengdu.

Relation with other Chinese languages
The Chengdu dialect is usually taken as a representative of Sichuanese. Sichuanese shares the most similar vocabulary with Yunnanese, a dialect of Southwestern Mandarin spoken in the neighboring province. However, the relationship between Sichuanese and Northern Mandarin dialects, including the standard language, is weaker than the relationship between Xiang and Gan.

In terms of vocabulary, Sichuanese has the second closest relationship with Xiang. The two varieties share a large number of exclusively unique words. This is mainly because many Xiang-speaking immigrants from Hunan moved to Sichuan during the great wave of immigration during the Ming and Qing Dynasties, so Xiang does not have such a close relationship with other southwestern varieties of Chinese, such as those spoken in Yunnan, Guangxi or Hubei. For example, in both Sichuanese and Xiang the verb "to squat" is "" (gu1) but "" (dūn) in standard Mandarin, the noun "kitchen" is "" (zao4vu2) but "" (chúfáng) in standard, and the adjective "thick" is "" (nyian4) but "" (nóng) in standard. Furthermore, the Sichuanese vocabulary also contains words from Old Xiang and Middle Xiang, such as "" (sloppy), "" (old) and "" (son).

Status
Though Sichuanese is not as endangered as some other languages of China, the prevalence of Sichuanese has dramatically lessened as the popularity of Standard Chinese has risen. Government policy limits the use of Sichuanese in broadcasting, television and many public places. Furthermore, the use of Sichuanese as a teaching medium is not permitted in the curriculum, which has resulted in a reduction of fluency among young people in Sichuanese-speaking areas since the 80s and 90s. The Sichuanese spoken by them is greatly influenced by the national language.

See also

Bashu culture

References

External links
Sichuan Provincial Gazetteer: dialects 四川省志: 方言志 
 Grainger, Adam. Western Mandarin, or, The spoken language of western China; 1900. American Presbyterian Mission Press
 Kilborn, Omar Leslie. Chinese lessons for first year students in West China. Kilborn (1917)

Mandarin Chinese
Varieties of Chinese